Cheltondale is a suburb of Johannesburg, South Africa. It is located in Region E of the City of Johannesburg Metropolitan Municipality.

History
The suburb is situated on part of an old Witwatersrand farm called Klipfontein. It was established in 1951 and was named after the developer, H. Dare's hometown Cheltondale, Gloucestershire.

References

Johannesburg Region E